'''XHQTO-FM
is a radio station on 97.9 FM in Querétaro. The station is owned by Grupo ACIR and airs the company's Match format of contemporary hit radio in English.

History
The station's concession was awarded in November 1994 to Aurora Ricco Pérez. The concession was sold to ACIR in 1998.
Azul 97 (1994-2000'S)
MIX FM (2000'S-2013)
Radio Felicidad (2013-2017)
After carrying its Radio Felicidad oldies format, Amor moved from XHJHS-FM 101.1 to XHQTO in August 2017. This lasted until the end of September 2022, when ACIR dropped the format in Querétaro.

On November 28 it was officially launched as Match FM.

References

Spanish-language radio stations
Radio stations in Querétaro
Grupo ACIR